Dresden Titans is a professional basketball club based in Dresden, Germany. Since the 2022/23 seasin, the club competes in the second tier ProA league.

Players

Current roster

Notable players
To appear in this section a player must have either:
- Set a club record or won an individual award as a professional player.
- Played at least one official international match for his senior national team at any time.
 Aaron Menzies

Season by season

Source: Eurobasket.com

References

External links
German League Profile
Presentation at Eurobasket.com

Sport in Dresden
Basketball teams in Germany
Basketball teams established in 2005